CLG Bhearna is a Gaelic Athletic Association club based in Bearna, County Galway, Ireland. The club is a member of the Galway GAA.  The club was merged with Spiddal at U16, U18 and U21 during the 1990s before reverting to its old form again in 2001.

CLG Bhearna were promoted to Senior Level for the first time in 1972 and have competed in the Galway Senior Club Football Championship over the years. They are one of 20 clubs who challenge for county title today. They have failed to win the competition in their history but have achieved a wide range of success at B level in the West Board section and at under-age level in recent years.

Honours
Galway Intermediate Football League: 1
1998
West Galway Football League Championship
1979 1998
West Galway Junior A Championship: 
1989
West Galway Under-21 A Football Championship
2000 2014
Galway Under-21 B Football Championship
1989
West Galway Board Under-21 B Football Championship
1989, 2006
Galway Minor B Football Championship
2005
West Galway Minor B Football Championship
2005
Galway West Minor B Football League
2003
Galway Feile (Under-14) Football Championship
2007, 2014
Galway Under-16 B Football League
1984
Galway Under-14 B Football League
1983

External links
 Official Club website

Gaelic football clubs in County Galway
Gaelic games clubs in County Galway